Devil's Point is a 1954 British drama film directed by Montgomery Tully and starring Richard Arlen, Greta Gynt and Donald Houston. The film was produced as a second feature, one of two made by producer Charles Deane starring Hollywood actor Arlen along with Stolen Time. It was released in the United States by 20th Century Fox as Devil's Harbor.

Plot 
John 'Captain' Martin (Richard Arlen) is a sailor who gets involved with a drug ring when he finds a package on a harbour containing their stolen goods. He meets with a detective and rounds up the hoodlums.

Cast 
Richard Arlen as John 'Captain' Martin
Greta Gynt as Peggy Mason
Donald Houston as Michael Mallard
Mary Germaine as Margaret Lane
Edwin Richfield as Daller
Michael Balfour as Bennett
John Dunbar as Sam
Vincent Ball as Williams
 Arnold Adrian as Mark
 Doreen Holliday as 	Susie Woods
Victor Baring as Enson
Sydney Bromley as Enson
Elspet Gray as June Mallard
 Antony Viccars as Detective Inspector Hunt
 Peter Bernard	as	Sam, pawnbroker
 Stuart Saunders as  Ryan
 Howard Lang as 	Marne

References

Bibliography
 Chibnall, Steve & McFarlane, Brian. The British 'B' Film. Palgrave MacMillan, 2009.

External links
 
 

1954 films
1954 crime drama films
British black-and-white films
British crime drama films
20th Century Fox films
Films directed by Montgomery Tully
1950s English-language films
1950s British films